Tylomelania perfecta is a species of freshwater snail with an operculum, an aquatic gastropod mollusk in the family Pachychilidae.

This is the first species of the genus Tylomelania that was described (under the name Melania perfecta) by malacologist Albert Mousson in 1849.

Distribution 
This species occurs in south, south-east and central Sulawesi, Indonesia. It is a widespread species of Tylomelania.

Ecology 
This is a riverine species.

References

External links 
  Sarasin P. & Sarasin F. (1897). "Über die Molluskenfauna der großen Süßwasser-Seen von Central-Celebes". Zoologischer Anzeiger 539/540: 308-320. page 316.

perfecta
Gastropods described in 1849
Taxobox binomials not recognized by IUCN